Dyachenko is a Ukrainian surname. Notable people with the surname include:

Alexsandr Dyachenko, Kazakh cyclist for Astana Team
Alexander Dyachenko, Russian sprint canoer
Alexandr Dyachenko, Kazakh beach volleyball player
Fedir Dyachenko, Hero of the Soviet Union
Darya Dyachenko, partisan and Hero of the Soviet Union
Maryna Dyachenko, Ukrainian sci-fi writer
Petro Dyachenko, Ukrainian military commander
Rod Dyachenko, Russian soccer player
Serhiy Dyachenko (writer), Ukrainian sci-fi writer
Tatyana Dyachenko, daughter of Boris Yeltsin

See also
 
Diachenko (disambiguation)

Ukrainian-language surnames